TCH may refer to:

 TCH (chemotherapy), a chemotherapy regimen
 Chad, by international vehicle registration code
 Czechoslovakia, by International Olympic Committee code
 Thomas Crosbie Holdings, Irish media group
 Trans-Canada Highway
 Tchibanga Airport, by IATA code
 Canberra Hospital, ACT Australia (formally known as the Woden hospital)

See also
 ТСН (Televiziyna Sluzhba Novyn), a Ukrainian news programme